Sergei Sychyov (born February 6, 1977 in Odesa) is a Ukrainian ice dancer who also competed internationally for Estonia. He competed internationally for Ukraine on the junior level with Julia Shevchenko. He teamed up with Anna Mosenkova in 1999 to compete for Estonia.

With Mosenkova, he is the 2000-2002 Estonian national champion and competed at the World Figure Skating Championships and European Figure Skating Championships, with a highest placement of 21st at the 2000 European Figure Skating Championships. They also competed on the ISU Grand Prix of Figure Skating. They were coached by Lea Rand, the mother of Estonian ice dancers Kristjan and Taavi Rand.

References

External links
 Tracings.net profile

Estonian male ice dancers
Ukrainian male ice dancers
1977 births
Living people
Sportspeople from Odesa